Luxemburger Illustrierte was a newspaper published in Luxembourg between 1924 and 1933.

Defunct newspapers published in Luxembourg
German-language newspapers published in Luxembourg
1924 establishments in Luxembourg
1933 disestablishments in Luxembourg
Newspapers established in 1924
Publications disestablished in 1933